The Life of Lazarillo de Tormes and of His Fortunes and Adversities is a Spanish novella, published anonymously because of its anticlerical content. It was published simultaneously in three cities in 1554: Alcalá de Henares, Burgos and Antwerp. The Alcalá de Henares edition adds some episodes which were most likely written by a second author. It is most famous as the book establishing the style of the picaresque satirical novel.

Summary
Lázaro is a boy of humble origins from Salamanca. After his stepfather is accused of thievery, his mother asks a wily blind beggar to take on Lazarillo (little Lázaro) as his apprentice. Lázaro develops his cunning while serving the blind beggar and several other masters, while also learning to take on his father's practice.

Table of contents:
Prologue
Chapter* 1: childhood and apprenticeship to a blind man.
Chapter* 2: serving a priest.
Chapter* 3: serving a squire.
Chapter* 4: serving a friar.
Chapter* 5: serving a pardoner.
Chapter* 6: serving a chaplain.
Chapter* 7: serving a pardoner and an archpriest.

*(or treatise)

Importance as a novella
Besides its importance in the Spanish literature of the Golden Age, Lazarillo de Tormes is credited with founding a literary genre, the picaresque novel, from the Spanish word pícaro, meaning "rogue" or "rascal." In novels of this type, the adventures of the pícaro expose injustice while amusing the reader. This extensive genre includes Cervantes' Rinconete y Cortadillo and El coloquio de los perros, Henry Fielding's Tom Jones and Mark Twain's Adventures of Huckleberry Finn. Its influence extends to twentieth century novels, dramas and films featuring the "anti-hero".

Prohibition
Lazarillo de Tormes was banned by the Spanish Crown and included in the Index of Forbidden Books of the Spanish Inquisition; this was at least in part due to the book's anti-clerical flavor.  In 1573, the Crown allowed circulation of a version which omitted Chapters 4 and 5 and assorted paragraphs from other parts of the book. An unabridged version did not appear in Spain until the nineteenth century. It was the Antwerp version that circulated throughout Europe, translated into French (1560), English (1576), Dutch (after the northern, largely Protestant Seven Provinces of the Low Countries revolted against Spain in 1579), German (1617), and Italian (1622).

Literary significance and criticism

The primary objections to Lazarillo had to do with its vivid and realistic descriptions of the world of the pauper and the petty thief. The "worm's eye view" of society contrasted sharply with the more conventional literary focus on  superhuman exploits recounted in  chivalric romances  such as the hugely popular Amadís de Gaula. In Antwerp, it followed the tradition of the impudent trickster figure Till Eulenspiegel.

Lazarillo introduced the picaresque device of delineating various professions and levels of society. A young boy or young man or woman describes masters or "betters" with ingenuously presented realistic details. But Lazarillo speaks of "the blind man," "the squire," "the pardoner," presenting these characters as types.

Significantly, the only named characters are Lazarillo and his family: his mother Antoña Pérez, his father Tomé Gonzáles, and his stepfather El Zayde. The surname de Tormes comes from the river Tormes. In the narrative, Lazarillo explains that his father ran a mill on the river, where he was literally born on the river. The Tormes runs through Lazarillo's home town, Salamanca, a Castilian-Leonese university city. (There is an old mill on the river, and a statue of Lazarillo and the blind man next to the Roman bridge [puente romano] in the city.)

Lazarillo is the diminutive of the Spanish name Lázaro. There are two appearances of the name Lazarus in the Bible, and not all critics agree as to which story the author was referring when he chose the name. The more well-known tale is in John 11:41–44, in which Jesus raises Lazarus from the dead.  The second is in Luke 16:19–31, a parable about a beggar named Lazarus at the gate of a stingy rich man's house.

In contrast to the fancifully poetic language devoted to fantastic and supernatural events about unbelievable creatures and chivalric knights, the realistic prose of Lazarillo described suppliants purchasing indulgences from the Church, servants forced to die with their masters on the battlefield (as Lazarillo's father did), thousands of refugees wandering from town to town, poor beggars flogged away by whips because of the lack of food. The anonymous author included many popular sayings and ironically interpreted popular stories.

The Prologue with Lázaro's extensive protest against injustice is addressed to a high-level cleric, and five of his eight masters in the novel serve the church. Lazarillo attacked the appearance of the church and its hypocrisy, though not its essential beliefs, a balance not often present in following picaresque novels.

Besides creating a new genre, Lazarillo de Tormes was critically innovative in world literature in several aspects:
Long before Emile (Jean-Jacques Rousseau). Oliver Twist (Charles Dickens) or Huckleberry Finn, the anonymous author of Lazarillo treated a boy as a boy, not a small adult.
Long before Moll Flanders (Daniel Defoe), Lazarillo describes the domestic and working life of a poor woman, wife, mother, climaxing in the flogging of Lazarillo's mother through the streets of the town after her black husband Zayde is hanged as a thief.
Long before modern treatment of "persons of color", this author treats sympathetically the pleasures and pains of an interracial family in his descriptions of life with his black stepfather and negrito half-brother, though their characterization is based on stereotypes.

Reference in Don Quixote
In his book Don Quixote, Cervantes introduces a gypsy thief called Ginés de Pasamonte who claims to be a writer (and who later in Part II masquerades as a puppeteer while on the run). Don Quixote interrogates this writer about his book:

Social criticism
The author criticises many organisations and groups in his book, most notably the Catholic Church and the Spanish aristocracy.

These two groups are clearly criticised through the different masters that Lazarillo serves. Characters such as the Cleric, the Friar, the Pardoner, the Priest and the Archbishop all have something wrong either with them as a person or with their character. The self-indulgent cleric concentrates on feeding himself, and when he does decide to give the "crumbs from his table" to Lazarillo, he says, "toma, come, triunfa, para tí es el mundo" "take, eat, triumph – the world is yours" a clear parody of a key communion statement.

In the final chapter, Lazarillo works for an Archpriest, who arranges his marriage to the Archpriest's maid.  It is clear that Lazarillo's wife cheats on him with the Archpriest, and all vows of celibacy are forgotten.

In Chapter 3, Lazarillo becomes the servant of a Squire. The Squire openly flaunts his wealth despite not being able to feed himself, let alone Lázaro. This is a parody of the importance of having a strong image among the nobility.

Authorship
The identity of the author of Lazarillo has been a puzzle for nearly four hundred years. Given the subversive nature of Lazarillo and its open criticism of the Catholic Church, it is likely that the author chose to remain anonymous out of fear of religious persecution.

Neither the author nor the date and place of the first appearance of the work is known. It appeared anonymously; and no author's name was accredited to it until 1605, when the Hieronymite monk José de Sigüenza named as its author Fray Juan de Ortega. Two years later, it was accredited by the Belgian Valère André to Diego Hurtado de Mendoza. In 1608, André Schott repeated this assertion, although less categorically.  Despite these claims, the assignment of the work to Diego Hurtado de Mendoza was generally accepted, until Alfred Paul Victor Morel-Fatio, in 1888, demonstrated the untenability of that candidate. The earliest known editions are the four of Alcalá de Henares, Antwerp, Medina del Campo, and Burgos, all of which appeared in 1554. Two continuations (or second parts) appeared – one, anonymously, in 1555, and the other, accredited to H. Luna, in 1620.

There has been some suggestion that the author was originally of Jewish extraction, but in 1492 had had to convert to Catholicism to avoid being expelled from Spain; that might explain the animosity towards the Catholic Church displayed in the book. Apart from the chronological difficulties this hypothesis presents, Catholic criticism of Catholic clergy, including the Pope, had had a long and even reputable tradition that can be seen in the works of famous Catholic writers such as Chaucer, Dante or Erasmus.

Documents recently discovered by the Spanish palaeographer Mercedes Agulló support the hypothesis that the author was, in fact, Diego Hurtado de Mendoza.

Sequels
In 1555, only a year after the first edition of the book, a sequel by another anonymous author was attached to the original Lazarillo in an edition printed in Antwerp, Low Countries. This sequel is known as El Lazarillo de Amberes, Amberes being the Spanish name for Antwerp.

Lázaro leaves his wife and child with the priest, in Toledo, and joins the Spanish army in their campaign against the Moors. The ship carrying the soldiers sinks, but before it does, Lázaro drinks as much wine as he can. His body is so full of wine that there is no place for the water to enter him, and by that means he survives under the sea. Threatened by the tuna fish there, Lázaro prays for mercy and is eventually metamorphosized into a tuna himself. Most of the book tells about how Lázaro struggles to find his place in tuna society.

In 1620, another sequel, by Juan de Luna, appeared in Paris. In the prologue, the narrator (not Lázaro himself but someone who claims to have a copy of Lázaro's writings) tells the reader that he was moved to publish the second part of Lázaro's adventures after hearing about a book which, he alleges, had falsely told of Lázaro being transformed into a tuna (obviously a disparaging reference to Lazarillo de Amberes).

Adaptations
1617: a play Spaansche Brabander by Gerbrand Adriaenszoon Bredero.
1959: a film adaptation  El Lazarillo de Tormes, film director César Fernández Ardavín.
1973: a Soviet Georgian adaptation by Ramaz Khotivari, The Adventures of Lazare (ლაზარეს თავგადასავალი / Приключения Лазаре)
1987: a loose film adaptation The Rogues, film director Mario Monicelli.
2001: a film adaptation Lázaro de Tormes,  film directors Fernando Fernán Gómez, José Luis García Sánchez.
2015: animation adaptation, El lazarillo de Tormes, film director Pedro Alonso Pablos.

Non-literary influence
Because of Lazarillo's first adventures, the Spanish word  has taken on the meaning "guide", as to a blind person. Consequently, in Spanish a guide dog is still informally called a perro lazarillo, as it was called before perro guía became common.

References

Further reading
 Anon, Lazarillo de Tormes, in: Two Spanish Picaresque Novels, Trans. Michael Alpert. Harmondsworth: Penguin Books, 1969.
 Benito-Vessels, Carmen, and Michael Zappala, Eds. The Picaresque: A Symposium on the Rogue’s Tale. Newark, NJ: University of Delaware Press / London & Toronto: Associated University Presses, 1994.
Fiore, Robert L. Lazarillo de Tormes. Boston: Twayne Publishers, 1984.
 Maravall, José Antonio. La Literatura Picaresca desde la Historia Social (Siglos XVI al XVII). Madrid: Taurus Ediciones, 1987.
 Parker, A. A. Literature and the Delinquent: the Picaresque Novel in Spain and Europe: 1599–1753. Edinburgh University Press, 1967.
 Sicroff, Albert A. "Sobre el estilo del Lazarillo de Tormes", in Nueva Revista de Filología Hispánica, Vol 11, No. 2 (1957).

External links

El lazarillo de Tormes 2015 animated mini-series
The Life of Lazarillo de Tormes and of His Machine Learning Adversities
  (Spanish and English)

1554 novels
Picaresque novels
Spanish satirical novels
Spanish novels
Spanish novels adapted into films
Spanish bildungsromans
Literary characters introduced in the 1550s